Harry Caray's Italian Steakhouse is an American steakhouse chain specializing in steak and Italian-American cuisine. The restaurant was established in 1987 in Chicago's River North neighborhood, in the former Chicago Varnish Company Building, by a partnership between popular Chicago Cubs broadcaster Harry Caray and restaurateur Grant DePorter. It has alternately been described by writers as "famed" and "legendary".

Harry Caray's fare includes steaks as well as pastas, salads, and seafood. They have a total of seven locations throughout the Chicago area, including one seafood restaurant named Harry Caray's Holy Mackerel. The original location contains a large array of sports and Cubs memorabilia.

See also
 List of steakhouses

References

Companies based in Chicago
Restaurants established in 1987
Regional restaurant chains in the United States
Steakhouses
Italian restaurants in the United States
1987 establishments in Illinois